John H. Williamson (1846–1911) was an African American politician and newspaper publisher in North Carolina. Born in Covington, Georgia, Williamson grew up in Louisburg, North Carolina. He served six terms in the North Carolina General Assembly from 1866 to 1888. In addition to his career as a state politician, Williamson served as justice of the peace, a member of the Franklin County Board of Education. Between 1881 and 1884 Williamson founded two newspapers: The Banner and The North Carolina Gazette. The former was the newspaper of the North Carolina Industrial Association, of which Williamson served as secretary.

Williamson died in Goldsboro, North Carolina on January 9, 1911. He is buried in the Louisburg (N.C.) City Cemetery.

See also

 African-American officeholders during and following the Reconstruction era

References

North Carolina Historical Marker

African-American state legislators in North Carolina
Members of the North Carolina House of Representatives
School board members in North Carolina
1846 births
1911 deaths
19th-century American politicians
Editors of North Carolina newspapers
20th-century African-American people